Timber Creek Township may refer to:
Timber Creek Township, Marshall County, Iowa
Timber Creek Township, Nance County, Nebraska